Taille de Noyer (also known as Mullanphy-Chambers House) is a historic house at 1 rue Taille de Noyer in Florissant, Missouri.

It was built in 1800 as a two room log cabin and fur trading post and was eventually expanded into a 22-room mansion. The house was added to the National Register of Historic Places on January 10, 1980
 It is one of the oldest houses in Missouri and is open for tours by the  Florissant Historical Society.

See also
List of the oldest buildings in Missouri

References

		
National Register of Historic Places in St. Louis County, Missouri
Buildings and structures completed in 1800